KCAR-FM (104.3 FM) is an American radio station broadcasting a classic hits format. Licensed to Baxter Springs, Kansas, it serves the greater Joplin, Missouri area. The station is currently owned by American Media Investments of Pittsburg, Kansas. The station carried an oldies format for many years, until March 12, 2010, when it flipped to comedy as "LOL 104.3." On October 18, 2012, the station flipped to Hot AC, branded as "Star 104.3". On February 1, 2019, the station switched back to a classic hits format branded as "The Rewind on 104.3 FM"

References

External links
The Rewind on 104.3 Website

CAR-FM
Radio stations established in 2010
Classic hits radio stations in the United States